A partial lunar eclipse took place on Monday, August 6, 1990, the second of two lunar eclipses in 1990.

Visibility

Relations to other lunar eclipses

Eclipses of 1990 
 An annular solar eclipse on January 26.
 A total lunar eclipse on February 9.
 A total solar eclipse on July 22.
 A partial lunar eclipse on August 6.

Lunar year series

Saros series

Half-Saros cycle
A lunar eclipse will be preceded and followed by solar eclipses by 9 years and 5.5 days (a half saros). This lunar eclipse is related to two total solar eclipses of Solar Saros 145.

See also 
List of lunar eclipses
List of 20th-century lunar eclipses

Notes

External links 
 

1990-08
1990 in science
August 1990 events